Thuliswa Winlove Nkabinde-Khawe (4 January 1973 – 1 November 2019) was a South African politician and a party member of the African National Congress (ANC). She was elected a Member of the Gauteng Provincial Legislature in May 2009 and was a long-serving member of the Social Development committee in the legislature, prior to her appointment as Gauteng MEC (Member of the Executive Council) for Social Development in May 2019. She was an MEC until her death just over five months later.

Early life and career
Nkabinde-Khawe was born on 4 January 1973 in the now-dissolved Transvaal Province. She became involved in politics at a young age, joining ACTSTOP, a civic organisation, in the 1980s where she held multiple leadership positions. She was part of the formation of the South African National Civic Organisation (SANCO) and was a senior leader in the structure. She was SANCO's provincial secretary at the time of her death.

She took office as a Member of the Gauteng Provincial Legislature in May 2009 and became a member of numerous committees including the Standing Committee of Public Accounts (SCOPA), Public Transport and Social Development. She was designated as the head of the Public Transport Committee in August 2012. She was the head of the Social Development Committee for the fifth provincial legislature from 2014 to 2019.

In May 2019, Nkabinde-Khawe was named MEC for Social Development by Premier David Makhura. She succeeded Nandi Mayathula-Khoza and took office as an MEC on 30 May 2019. She held the post for just over five months.

Death
Nkabinde-Khawe died on 1 November 2019 in the Mulbarton Hospital in Alberton, Gauteng. She died following a short illness. The Gauteng ANC said that her death "will leave void in social development sector". The opposition Democratic Alliance also sent their condolences to the family. She is survived by her husband, Jacob Khawe, a senior ANC politician in the province, and their six children. Panyaza Lesufi was named her acting successor. Nkabinde-Khawe received a category 1 provincial funeral that was held on 8 November 2019. She was buried at the Meyerton Cemetery in Meyerton.

References

External links
 Thuliswa Nkabinde – People's Assembly

1973 births
2019 deaths
21st-century South African politicians
African National Congress politicians
Members of the Gauteng Provincial Legislature
People from Gauteng
21st-century South African women politicians